Kweku Tanikyi Kesse is a Ghanaian engineer and politician. He is a former Member of Parliament of Evalue Gwira Constituency and a member of the National Democratic Congress of Ghana. He lost his re-election bid to Catherine Afeku in the 2016 parliamentary election whom he had earlier defeated during the 2012 parliamentary election.

Early life and education
Kesse was born on 7 July 1967. He hails from Bamiankor, a town in the Western Region of Ghana. He obtained his Master of Science degree in Automatic Control Engineering from the Universidad Central de Las Villas, Cuba in 1994.

Career
Kesse worked at the Tema Oil Refinery as a Projects Engineer from 1997 to 2002. He later joined RAM Engineering Limited where he worked as a Project Manager from 2004 to 2009. From 2009 until 2012, Kesse was the managing director of KABK Engineering Limited

Politics
Kesse entered parliament on 7 January 2013 representing the Evalue-Gwira constituency on the ticket of the National Democratic Congress. He lost the seat in 2016 to Catherine Afeku of the New Patriotic Party

Personal life
Kesse is married with three children. He identifies as a Christian.

References

Ghanaian engineers
Ghanaian MPs 2013–2017
National Democratic Congress (Ghana) politicians
20th-century births
People from Western Region (Ghana)
Year of birth missing (living people)
Living people